Timika is a chartered city (kota), and the capital of Mimika Regency on the southern coast of Central Papua, Indonesia. At the 2020 Census, the district which includes the town (it remains administratively within the Regency, rather than having a separate status) had a population of 142,909.

Air transport
In August 2012, the Indonesian government announced plans to develop a new commercial airport in Timika. The Mozes Kilangin International Airport will feature a new apron and taxiway created on an 800x300m plot of land adjacent to the existing airport.

Beginning from 15 August 2014, the airline Garuda Indonesia has been serving the Timika-Sorong-Manado route for 3 times a week with a Bombardier CRJ-1000 plane that has 84 economy class seats and 12 business class seats.

Climate
Timika has a tropical rainforest climate (Af) with heavy to very heavy rainfall year-round.

References

 
Populated places in Central Papua
Districts of Central Papua
Regency seats of Central Papua